The Convento de San Esteban is a Dominican monastery situated in the Plaza del Concilio de Trento (Council of Trent) in the Spanish city of Salamanca.

History

The Dominicans settled in Salamanca in about 1255, but their original monastery was demolished to construct the parish church of St. Stephen in 1524, at the initiative of Cardinal Juan Álvarez de Toledo. Construction took until 1610, and involved Martin de Santiago, Rodrigo Gil de Hontañón,  and Pedro Gutiérrez. However, the layout and design are by Juan de Álava, who began the work in 1524, as evidenced by a plan in his possession. Rodrigo Gil de Hontañón was involved with the transepts and the dome. Although the church is considered to be an excellent example of the Plateresque style, the long period of construction explains the mixture of styles ranging from Gothic to the late Baroque, the latter not so noticeable in the architecture but very apparent in the reredos of the main altar by José de Churriguera. According to tradition, Christopher Columbus stayed in this monastery (actually in the earlier building it replaced) when he came to Salamanca to defend his idea of reaching the Indies by sailing west, against the geographers of the University.

During the Counter Reformation it was an important center for the Dominicans who founded the School of Salamanca, headed by Francisco de Vitoria.

Art and Architecture

Facade

The facade comprises the front of the church and the adjacent monastery portico. The front the church is one of the finest examples of the Plateresque style. It is conceived as an external reredos, in the form of a triumphal arch under whose barrel vault unfolds the abundant decoration characteristic of this style. The portico, composed of arches, is inspired by Italian renaissance loggias, its plain ornamentation contrasting with the decorative exuberance of the church facade.

Church

Construction of the church commenced under the architect Juan de Álava in 1524, followed by Brother Martin de Santiago, who was succeeded by Rodrigo Gil de Hontañón. It was consecrated in 1610. It has a Latin cross plan with a single nave, with the choir above a segmented arch at the foot of the church. The styles present are late Gothic in the lower parts of the building to the Renaissance in the dome and presbytery. It measures 14.5 metres wide by 27 metres high in the nave and 44 metres at the dome. The choir features paintings of the Triumph of the Church of Antonio Palomino and a Madonna and Child by Rubens.

Cloisters and Chapter-houses

The main cloister, the processional cloister or the "Cloister of the Kings", is the work of Brother Martin de Santiago, a member of the monastery. The lower level blends elements the Gothic and the Renaissance. The arches that border the garden are semicircular, in Renaissance style but treated as Gothic, and divided by three mullions. The vaults of the four bays are ribbed with Gothic features. In the center of the garden stands a shrine.
The upper level has a simple wooden ceiling, galleried by forty arches, resting on pilasters, whose capitals are decorated with grotesques and other motives.

From the ground floor the chapter houses can be accessed. The "Ancient Chapter" is dark, simple and austere, from the 14th century, with work from the following centuries. One of its sections is the chapel, where at the upper level the most prominent members of the monastery are buried, including Francisco de Vitoria and Domingo de Soto. Ordinary members of the order are buried at the lower level where the monks sat on benches against the walls for their meetings. The "New Chapter" is larger, more monumental and better lit than the older one and dates from the 17th century. It is similar in design to the sacristy, which is accessed via the Soto staircase.

Sacristy

The sacristy was built in the 17th century under the patronage of Brother Pedro de Herrera Suárez, bishop of Tuy, by architects Sardiña Alonso and Juan Moreno. The walls feature Corinthian pilasters with curved and triangular pediments, topped with pyramids, all in classical taste. The frieze is decorated with brackets and various allegories. The patron built the sacristy also as a place for his burial: in a niche, high on the left, his stone polychrome effigy, the work of Antonio de Paz, is seen in prayer. Images of the Assumption of the Virgin, St. Peter and St. Paul by the same artist are found in the headwall, presided over by a Christ figure in the foreground known as Jesus of Promise.

Soto Staircase

This staircase was built between 1553 and 1556 and its name comes from the patron, Brother Domingo de Soto, professor at the University (part of the School of Salamanca) and confessor of Emperor Charles V. The designer was the architect Rodrigo Gil de Hontañón, who used a revolutionary new technique of cantilevering the stairs out from the walls, without other bearers, creating a space that allows the transition from the lower to the upper cloister. It is decorated with polychrome relief floral coffers, and Mary Magdalene appears in its upper section.

Main Reredos

The work of José de Churriguera, crowning the head of the church, has six large twisted columns, covered with decorative foliage. In the center is a tabernacle conceived as a pavilion, flanked by a pair of columns on each side, and between those of the two columns at the edges stand niches that harbour the sculptures of St. Dominic of Guzmán and St. Francis of Assis, attributed to the designer of the altarpiece.
Centered above this is a painting by Claudio Coello whose theme is the martyrdom of St. Stephen.
Everything is covered with gold and richly decorated, resulting in one of the most monumental Spanish baroque altarpieces.

Areas reserved for the monastic community
In the part of the building reserved for the sole use of the monastic community there are two cloisters. One is known as the "Columbus Cloister" where, according to tradition, the explorer conferred with the brethren over his project. It dates from the late 15th century, but its layout is simple, with round arches resting on robust and simple capitals, and with a Baroque window in the background. The other is called the "Cisterns Cloister" and features a decorative austerity, marked by empty spaces and smooth surfaces, which contrasts with the decorative exuberance of other parts of the building.

Institutions

Faculty of Theology
The monastery houses the Pontifical Theological Faculty of St. Stephen, founded in 1947, successor to the General Study of Theology which was set up in San Esteban in 1222. Activities of the Faculty include the Conversations of San Esteban, the San Esteban School of Theology and the St. Thomas Aquinas Internet School of Theology at www.fatse.org. It also has its own publishing house, Editorial San Esteban.

Guilds
San Esteban is also the canonical seat of the Dominican Fraternity of Holy Christ of the Good Death which makes its penitential procession in Salamanca's Holy Week at dawn on Good Friday, and the Royal and Pontifical Sacrament Confraternity of Mary, Mother of God of the Rosary and St. Pius V fraternity of glory, restarted recently after years of inactivity.

References

External links

 The content of this article incorporates material from an entry in the Enciclopedia Libre Universal, published in Spanish under a Commons Attribution-ShareAlike 3.0 Unported License

Christian monasteries established in the 16th century
1618 establishments in Spain
Roman Catholic churches in Salamanca
16th-century Roman Catholic church buildings in Spain
Monasteries in Castile and León
Renaissance architecture in Salamanca
Plateresque architecture in Castile and León